Appliance Art, Inc. is an American company specializing in transformational decor, mainly for kitchens.  The company has invented products that instantly changes surfaces, either temporarily or permanently.

History
Appliance Art, Inc. was founded by Grant T. Smith in 2008 to give people options to upgrade the look of their kitchens without buying new appliances and countertops.

Products
Appliance Art is the initial line of products launched by Appliance Art, Inc. that allows purchasers to update older appliances like dishwashers and refrigerators with magnetic or vinyl panels. Appliance Art appliance covers are solid color, texture, paintings, and other designs that are affixed to an appliance magnetically or in an adhesive vinyl fashion. They can change the look, feel and design of any appliance to match an existing decor, or to create a new look.

Their "Instant" line of products are similar to contact paper. The peel and stick products can be applied directly over old counter tops and pulled off if needed. These line includes Instant Chalkboard, Instant Stainless, and Instant Granite.

References

External links
 Official website

Manufacturing companies established in 2008
2008 establishments in Georgia (U.S. state)